The 10th Indian Motor Brigade was a formation of the Indian Army during World War II.
It was formed in Egypt in March 1942.

During its time active the brigade was under the command of three different higher formations, the 
10th Armoured Division, the 51st Highland Division, and, from September 1942 to 1943, the Tenth Army.

Formation
1st Duke of York's Own Skinner's Horse
Central India Horse (21st King George V's Own Horse)
5th Battalion, 13th Frontier Force Rifles
10th Queen Victoria's Own Frontier Force Guides Cavalry [May - June 1942]
402nd Field Squadron Indian Engineers

and from November 1942
3rd Battalion, 11th Sikh Regiment
4th Battalion, 8th Punjab Regiment

See also

 List of Indian Army Brigades in World War II

References

British Indian Army brigades